Parmelia is a genus of medium to large foliose lichens. It has a global distribution, extending from the Arctic to the Antarctic continent but concentrated in temperate regions. There are about 40 species in Parmelia. In recent decades, the once large genus Parmelia has been divided into a number of smaller genera according to thallus morphology and phylogenetic relatedness.

It is a foliaceous lichen, resembling a leaf in shape.  The ends of the leaf-like lobes are often squarish-tipped. The upper surface is pale bluish-gray to light brown in direct sunlight, with a network web-like ridges and depressions. The lower surface is black and has rhizines anchoring it to the substrate. In general, Parmelia have a dark lower side with rhizines ('rootlets') that attach the lichen to its substrate. The upper side may be several colours - grey, yellow, brown - and may have reproductive organs on it. These may be apothecia (ascospore-producing bodies), isidia or soralia (both vegetative structures). In between these two layers is the medulla, which contains the algal component of the lichen.

Taxonomy
Parmelia was circumscribed by Swedish lichenologist Erik Acharius in 1803. His idea of the genus, which included foliose species with lecanorine apothecia, was quite broad and included species that are now dispersed in many different genera and families, such as the Peltigeraceae (Lobaria), the Pannariaceae (Pannaria, Parmeliella), the Physciaceae (Physcia, Heterodermia, Physconia),  the Teloschistaceae (Xanthoria), as well as the Parmeliaceae (Cetraria, Hypogymnia, and Parmeliopsis). Its broad circumscription meant that almost every lichen with a thalline apothecial rim was included by 19th-century authors.

In an attempt to create more homogeneous groups of taxa, lichenologists created new segregate genera for species once in Parmelia. These included Menegazzia (1854), Parmotrema (1860), Anzia (1861), Parmeliopsis (1869), Hypogymnia (1896), Pseudevernia (1903), Pannoparmelia (1912), and Pseudoparmelia (1914). In the 1970s and 1980s, electron microscopy was used to help divide several Parmelia species groups into different genera based on the structure of their cortex. These include Arctoparmelia,  Bulbothrix, Canoparmelia, Cetrariastrum, Concamerella, Everniastrum, Flavoparmelia, Hypotrachyna, Neofuscelia, Paraparmelia, Parmelina, Parmotrema, Pseudoparmelia, Relicina, Relicinopsis, Xanthomaculina, and Xanthoparmelia. Another group of species was segregated on the basis of the presence of pseudocyphellae: Punctelia, Flavopunctelia, and Melanelia. In Mason Hale's 1987 monograph on Parmelia, he commented: "The group has been further subdivided ... now leaving in Parmelia a small, apparently irreducible assemblage of species typified by P. saxatilis". In 2016, however, sixteen mostly Australasian species were moved to the new genus Notoparmelia; these species had been shown by molecular phylogenetic analysis to form a monophyletic lineage in Parmelia.

Fossil record
There are two foliose fossil taxa, Parmelia ambra and P. isidiiveteris, that have been placed provisionally in genus Parmelia due to their overall resemblance to members of this genus. Later authors have suggested, however, that this generic placement is not appropriate for the current concept of Parmelia, and that because of the dearth of specimens available for analysis, it is impossible to know for certain which of the many foliose genera in the family Parmeliaceae is best suited for these fossils.

Description
Parmelia species have a foliose (leafy) thallus with a substrate attachment ranging from loose to tight. The lobes comprising the thallus are rounded, more or less straight, and may be contiguous or overlapping (imbricate). The texture of the upper thallus ranges from smooth to foveolate (covered with puts and depressions). The colour is typically green to whitish grey to greyish brown, and some species have a coating of pruina on the surface. Most species have pseudocyphellae (tiny pores that allow for gas exchange), and vegetative propagules such as isidia or soredia, or both. The lower surface of the thallus is black (or close to it), and has rhizines (either simple or branched) that function as holdfasts to attach it to its substrate. The cortex (botany) is paraplectenchymatous – a cell arrangement where the hyphae are oriented in all directions.

The ascomata of Parmelia species are in the form of apothecia, which have a zeorine structure (an apothecium in which a proper exciple is enclosed in the thalline exciple) and are laminal (superficial on the surface) to somewhat stipitate. The exposed upper surface of the hymenium, the disc, is brown, rarely blackish. The asci are eight-spored, while the spores are colorless, ellipsoid, and measure 10–18 by 5–13 μm. The conidiomata are in the form of pycnidia; these black spots are laminal and immersed in the thallus surface. They produce dumbbell-shaped conidia with dimensions of 5.5–8 μm. The photobiont partners of Parmelia are green algae from the genera Asterochloris or Trebouxia.

Ecology
Parmelia lichens are food for the caterpillars of certain Lepidoptera, such as the bagworm moth Taleporia tubulosa.

Conservation
Two species of Parmelia have been assessed by the International Union for Conservation of Nature for the global IUCN Red List. Both Parmelia saxatilis and P. sulcata are considered species of least concern due to their widespread distribution, abundance, and stable populations.

Distribution
Eleven Parmelia species were recorded for Europe in 2008. Nine occur in the Nordic lichen flora, of which P. saxatilis and P. sulcata are most common and widespread.

Species

Parmelia adaugescens 
† Parmelia ambra  – extinct; fossilized in Dominican amber
Parmelia asiatica  – China
Parmelia barrenoae  – Europe
Parmelia cochleata 
Parmelia discordans  – Europe
Parmelia encryptata 
Parmelia ernstiae  – Europe
Parmelia fertilis 
Parmelia fraudans 
Parmelia hygrophila  – North America
Parmelia hygrophiloides  – India
Parmelia imbricaria 
† Parmelia isidiiveteris  – extinct; fossilized in Dominican amber
Parmelia lambii  – Antarctica
Parmelia marmariza 
Parmelia mayi  – northeastern North America
Parmelia meiophora 
Parmelia neocaledonica 
Parmelia neodiscordans 
Parmelia niitakana 
Parmelia omphalodes  – Europe
Parmelia pinnatifida  – Europe
Parmelia protosignifera  – Australia
Parmelia pseudoshinanoana 
Parmelia rojoi  – Europe
Parmelia saxatilis  – Europe
Parmelia sectilis 
Parmelia serrana  – Europe
Parmelia shinanoana 
Parmelia skultii  – Europe
Parmelia squarrosa  – Europe
Parmelia submontana  – Europe
Parmelia submutata 
Parmelia sulcata  – Europe
Parmelia sulymae

References

Cited literature

Lichen genera
Taxa named by Erik Acharius
Lecanorales genera
Taxa described in 1803